The Jymy-class motor torpedo boats (English: "Rumble") or J class was an Italian-designed and built class of motor torpedo boats, seeing service during World War II with the Royal Italian Navy and later with the Finnish Navy. The four boats of the J class were built by Cantieri Baglietto in Genoa, Italy and purchased by the Finns on 5 June 1943. Following World War II, the vessels were rearmed according to the Paris Peace Treaty of 1947, losing their torpedo capabilities and given more guns. They were removed from service in 1961.

Design and description
The J class were initially four motor torpedo boats of the Italian . The motor torpedo boats were propelled by two propellers powered by two Isotta-Fraschini petrol engines creating . The J class were armed with two  torpedo tubes, one  Breda gun and one  machine gun.

Vessels of the class

Construction and career
All four vessels were constructed in Italy and served with the Royal Italian Navy during World War II. Finland acquired the four motor torpedo boats on 5 June 1943. The Paris Peace Treaty of 1947 was signed following the end of World War II, and Finland was prohibited by the treaty from having torpedo-carrying vessels. The ships were converted into motor gunboats in 1949, in accordance with the treaty. The vessels were rearmed with a  gun in addition to the 20 mm gun. The J-class vessels were stricken from the naval vessel register in 1961.

Citations

References
 
 
 
 
 

Torpedo boats of the Finnish Navy
Torpedo boat classes